The Jahres-Bericht über die Leistungen der chemischen Technologie was a German scientific journal on chemistry, pharmacy and metallurgy, published from 1855 to at least 1935.

The journal changed its title several times. From 1855 to 1858 it was published as the Jahres-Bericht über die Fortschritte der chemischen Technologie für Fabrikanten, Chemiker, Pharmaceuten, Hütten- und Forstleute und Cameralisten and from 1859 to 1864 as the Jahres-Bericht über die Fortschritte und Leistungen der chemischen Technologie und technischen Chemie.

References

Further reading

External links
Online digital version of this journal maintained by HathiTrust.

Chemistry journals